In statistics, Hodges' estimator (or the Hodges–Le Cam estimator), named for Joseph Hodges, is a famous counterexample of an estimator which is "superefficient", i.e. it attains smaller asymptotic variance than regular efficient estimators. The existence of such a counterexample is the reason for the introduction of the notion of regular estimators.

Hodges' estimator improves upon a regular estimator at a single point. In general, any superefficient estimator may surpass a regular estimator at most on a set of Lebesgue measure zero.

Construction 
Suppose  is a "common" estimator for some parameter : it is consistent, and converges to some asymptotic distribution  (usually this is a normal distribution with mean zero and variance which may depend on ) at the -rate:
 

Then the Hodges' estimator  is defined as
 
This estimator is equal to  everywhere except on the small interval , where it is equal to zero.
 
for any . This estimator is superefficient, as it surpasses the asymptotic behavior of the efficient estimator  at least at one point . In general, superefficiency may only be attained on a subset of Lebesgue measure zero of the parameter space .

Example 

Suppose x1, ..., xn is an independent and identically distributed (IID) random sample from normal distribution  with unknown mean but known variance. Then the common estimator for the population mean θ is the arithmetic mean of all observations: . The corresponding Hodges' estimator will be , where 1{...} denotes the indicator function.

The mean square error (scaled by n) associated with the regular estimator x is constant and equal to 1 for all θs. This demonstrates that the Hodges' estimator is not regular, and its asymptotic properties are not adequately described by limits of the form (θ fixed).

See also 
 James–Stein estimator

Notes

References 

 
 
 
 

Estimator